Pigany  (Pihany) is a village in the administrative district of Gmina Sieniawa, within Przeworsk County, Subcarpathian Voivodeship, in south-eastern Poland.

The village has a population of 339.

References

Pigany